Carlo Pio di Savoia (7 April 1622 – 13 February 1689) was an Italian Catholic Cardinal of the Pio di Savoia family. He was the nephew of Cardinal Carlo Emanuele Pio di Savoia.

Early life

Pio was born 7 April 1622, the son of Ascanio Pio di Savoia and Eleonora Mattei.

At age 17, Pio went to Rome and then travelled throughout Europe until 1641. Thereafter he joined the army of the Duke of Ferrara as a colonel but was captured by the Florentines in Moncessino. He was released at the end of the war and was appointed treasurer-general of the Apostolic Chamber in 1650. Two years later he bought a position (as was the custom) as personal treasurer to Pope Innocent X.

On 5 Sep 1655, he was consecrated bishop by Giambattista Spada, Cardinal-Priest of Santa Susanna, with Carlo Nembrini, Bishop of Parma, and Giacomo Theodoli, Bishop of Forlì, serving as co-consecrators.

Ecclesiastic career

On 2 March 1654 he was elevated to cardinal by Pope Innocent and was appointed Cardinal-deacon of the church of Santa Maria in Domnica. Over the subsequent two decades he was appointed to various churches as Cardinal-deacon and Cardinal-priest including:

Cardinal-deacon of Sant'Eustachio (11 February 1664)
Cardinal-priest of Santa Prisca (14 November 1667)
Cardinal-priest of San Crisogono (28 January 1675)
Cardinal-priest of S. Maria in Trastevere (1 December 1681)
Cardinal-bishop of Sabina (15 February 1683)

Between 1673 and his death in 1689, he served as Cardinal-protector of Austria.

References

Sources
 
 

1622 births
1689 deaths
17th-century Italian cardinals